At the annual Harvard–Yale football game on November 20, 2004, Yale students, costumed as a Harvard "pep squad", distributed placards to Harvard fans for a card stunt. When the fans raised the placards together, they read "We Suck".

The practical joke was conceived of and coordinated by Michael Kai and David Aulicino, two Yale students in the class of 2005, and was executed with the help of 20 classmates disguised as the "Harvard Pep Squad". The perpetrators handed crimson-and-white placards to fans in the central area of the Harvard side of the stadium—mostly Harvard alumni, with a few faculty, students, and others. The group told the crowd that, by lifting the placards, they would spell "Go Harvard". 

Most Harvard students were sitting in a section off to the side of the alumni area where the prank was executed, and they left the stands unaware of the prank; however, players on the field did see the placards.

Response
Initially, many at Harvard denied that the prank had happened. In response, Yale students registered the domain name "harvardsucks.org" (as well as "yalesucks.com" in a preemptive move) and posted a video detailing their efforts. Chuck Sullivan, Harvard's director of athletic communications, said, "[It was] all in good fun." In an interview with The Harvard Crimson, the prank's organizers claimed that members of the Harvard Band were complicit with the Yale pranksters. This was a further hoax designed to “toss salt in the wound”, as stated by Kai. Sometime in 2021, the domain name "harvardsucks.org" expired, and was not renewed. As of 2023, "harvardsucks.org" and consequently, "yalesucks.com", both direct to a "Domain not claimed" screen.

Media and Internet coverage
The prank was covered by newspapers, radio programs, Jimmy Kimmel Live!, MSNBC, and several other TV shows. Several magazines have listed the prank among the greatest in college history. A satirical article in Maxim says that Yale perpetrated "the greatest prank this side of the Mason–Dixon line since the Boston Tea Party ... and caused dozens of stoic, blue-blooded Harvard men to spit port wine all over their smoking jackets." Sports Illustrated featured the prank with "some of the best attempts to get the other guy's goat". ESPN and ESPN2 featured the prank in a 15-minute documentary on the rivalry.

Similar pranks
This prank echoes many similar stunts, most notably the Great Rose Bowl Hoax of 1961. In that Rose Bowl game between the University of Washington and the University of Minnesota, Caltech students had manipulated several of the card stunts led by Washington cheerleaders, the last of which caused the letters in "Caltech" to be spelled out.

See also
 Great Rose Bowl Hoax
 List of practical joke topics

References

External links
 www.harvardsucks.org , website maintained by the pranksters

American football incidents
College football controversies
Harvard Crimson football
Practical jokes
Yale Bulldogs football
November 2004 events in the United States
Harvard-Yale prank